Nebrarctia semiramis is a moth of the family Erebidae. It was described by Otto Staudinger in 1891. It is found in Turkey, Pakistan and Iran.

Subspecies
Nebrarctia semiramis semiramis
Nebrarctia semiramis elbursi (Daniel, 1937) (Pakistan)

References

Spilosomina
Moths described in 1891